Eritrea Governorate was one of the six governorates of Italian East Africa. Its capital was Asmara. It was formed from the previously separate colony of Italian Eritrea, which was enlarged with parts of the conquered Ethiopian Empire following the Second Italo-Ethiopian War.

History

In 1936, after the defeat of Ethiopia, Italy created an empire in Africa called "Africa Orientale Italiana". It lasted 6 years until WWII and was made of 6 governorates. One of these was the "Eritrea Governorate". The original Italian Eritrea, called even Colonia primogenita (first colony), was enlarged of 110.000 km2 with territories ("Tigrai") taken from northern Ethiopia that were populated mostly by ethnic Eritreans.
 
In 1938 the Eritrea governorate was divided in 13 "commissariati" (provinces)
 Commissariato dell'Acchelè Guzai (capital Addì Caièh)
 Commissariato di Adigrat (capital Adigràt)
 Commissariato dell'Hamasien (capital Asmára)
 Commissariato del Bassopiano Occidentale (capital Agordàt)
 Commissariato del Bassopiano Orientale (capital Massáua)
 Commissariato di Cheren (capital Chéren)
 Commissariato della Dancalia (capital Ássab)
 Commissariato di Macallè (capital Macallè)
 Commissariato dei Paesi Galla (capital Allomatà)
 Commissariato del Seraè (capital Áddi Ugrì)
 Commissariato del Tembien (capital Abbì Addì)
 Commissariato del Tigrai Occidentale (capital Ádua)

The Eritrea Governorate in 1938 had an area of 231,280 km² and a population of more than 1500,000 - of which nearly 100,000 were Italian colonists concentrated in Asmara.

Massawa was the port of the Italian Colony of Eritrea and was hugely improved and enlarged.

Eritrea was chosen by the Italian government to be the industrial center of the Africa Orientale Italiana. The Italian government implemented agricultural reforms, primarily on farms owned by Italian colonists (exports of coffee boomed in the 1930s). 

In the region of Asmara there were in 1940 more than 2,000 small and medium sized industrial companies, concentrated in the areas of construction, mechanics, textiles, electricity and food processing. According to the Italian census of 1939 the city of Asmara had a population of 98,000, of which 53,000 were Italians. This fact made Asmara the main "Italian town" of the Italian empire in Africa. Furthermore, because of the Italian architecture of the city, Asmara was called Piccola Roma (Little Rome).

In all Eritrea the Italians were more than 75,000 in that year.

Consequently, the living standard of life in Eritrea in 1939 was considered one of the best of Africa, for the Italian colonists and for the native Eritreans. In early 1940 laws were established that enabled all the autochthonous Eritreans in the Italian military forces to receive a "pension" with their families; no other European colonial country granted this at that moment.
 
In summer 1940 the Italians conquered in British Sudan the area of Kassala, that was temporarily annexed (the mayor of Kassala was Eritrean hero Hamid Idris Awate) until spring 1941.  In those months the Allies invaded Italian Eritrea and the last governor (Luigi Frusci) surrendered on May 19, 1941.

The British destroyed the Eritrea Governorate and created a military occupation government associated with Ethiopia's Negus: during the East African campaign of World War II it fell under British occupation in early 1941.

Governors
 
There were 5 Italian governors, under a Viceroy representing the emperor Victor Emmanuel III:
Pietro Badoglio, in May 1936
 Alfredo Guzzoni, from May 1936 until April 1937
 Vincenzo De Feo, from April 1937 until December 1937
 Giuseppe Daodice, from December 1937 until June 1940
 Luigi Frusci, from June 1940 until May 1941

Notes

Bibliography
  
 
 Bandini, Franco. Gli italiani in Africa, storia delle guerre coloniali 1882-1943. Longanesi. Milano, 1971.
 Bereketeab, R. Eritrea: The making of a Nation. Uppsala University. Uppsala, 2000.
 Lowe, C.J. Italian Foreign Policy 1870-1940. Routledge. 2002.
 Maravigna, Pietro. Come abbiamo perduto la guerra in Africa. Le nostre prime colonie in Africa. Il conflitto mondiale e le operazioni in Africa Orientale e in Libia. Testimonianze e ricordi. Tipografia L'Airone. Roma, 1949.
 Negash, Tekeste. Italian colonialism in Eritrea 1882-1941 (Politics, Praxis and Impact). Uppsala University. Uppsala, 1987.

See also
List of Governors of the Eritrea Governorate
Italian Governors of Eritrea
Italian Eritrea
Italian Eritreans
Italian Pidgin of Eritrea

Governorates of Italian East Africa
Italian Eritrea